"The System of Doctor Tarr and Professor Fether" is a dark comedy short story by the American author Edgar Allan Poe. First published in Graham's Magazine in November 1845, the story centers on a naïve and unnamed narrator's visit to a mental asylum in the southern provinces of France.

Plot summary
The story follows an unnamed narrator who visits a mental institution in southern France (more accurately, a "Maison de Santé") known for a revolutionary new method of treating mental illnesses called the "system of soothing". A companion with whom he is travelling knows Monsieur Maillard, the originator of the system, and makes introductions before leaving the narrator. The narrator is shocked to learn that the "system of soothing" has recently been abandoned. He questions this, as he has heard of its success and popularity, but Maillard tells him to "believe nothing you hear, and only one half that you see".

The narrator tours the grounds of the hospital and is invited to dinner, where he is joined by twenty-five to thirty other people and a large, lavish spread of food. The other guests are dressed somewhat oddly: though their clothes are well made, they do not seem to fit the people very well. Most of them are female and are "bedecked with a profusion of jewelry, such as rings, bracelets and earrings, and wore their bosoms and arms shamefully bare". The table and the room are decorated with an excess of lit candles wherever it is possible to find a place for them. Dinner is also accompanied by musicians playing "fiddles, fifes, trombones and a drum", and though they seem to entertain all the others present, the narrator likens the music to horrible noises (at one point even mentioning the torture and execution device known as the brazen bull). The narrator says that there is much of the "bizarre" about everything at the dinner.

Conversation as they eat focuses on the patients they have been treating. They demonstrate for the narrator the strange behavior they have witnessed, including patients who thought themselves a teapot, a donkey, cheese, champagne, a frog, snuff tobacco, a pumpkin, and others. Maillard occasionally tries to calm them down, and the narrator seems very concerned by their behavior and passionate imitations.

He then learns that this staff has replaced the system of soothing with a much stricter system, which Maillard says is based on the work of a "Doctor Tarr" and a "Professor Fether". The narrator says he is not familiar with their work, to the astonishment of the others. It is finally explained why the previous system was abandoned: one "singular" incident, Maillard says, occurred when the patients, granted a large amount of liberty around the house, overthrew their doctors and nurses, usurped their positions, and locked them up as lunatics. These lunatics were led by a man who claimed to have invented a better method of treating mental illness, and who allowed no visitors except for "a very stupid-looking young gentleman of whom he had no reason to be afraid". The narrator asks how the hospital staff rebelled and returned things to order. Just then, loud noises are heard and the hospital staff breaks from their confines. It is revealed that the dinner guests are, in fact, the patients, who have just recently taken over. As part of their uprising, the inmates treated the staff to tarring and feathering. The keepers now put the real patients, including Monsieur Maillard (who had once been the superintendent before going mad himself), back in their cells, while the narrator admits that he has yet to find any of the works of Dr. "Tarr" and Professor "Fether".

The "system of soothing"
Monsieur Maillard's system avoids all punishments and does not confine its patients. They are granted a great deal of freedom and are not forced to wear hospital gowns, but instead are "permitted to roam about the house and grounds in the ordinary apparel of persons in right mind". The doctors have "humored" their patients by never contradicting their fantasies or hallucinations. For example, if a man thinks he is a chicken, doctors treat him as a chicken, giving him corn to eat. The system is apparently very popular. Monsieur Maillard says that all the "Maisons de Santé" in France have adopted it. The narrator remarks that after the patient revolt is crushed, the soothing system is reinstated at the asylum he has visited, though modified in certain ways that are intended to reform it.

Publication history
"The System of Doctor Tarr and Professor Fether" was held by editors for several months before being published in Graham's Magazine for November 1845.

Analysis
At the time this story was written, the care of the insane was a significant political issue in the United States. People were calling for asylum reform because the mentally ill were being treated as prisoners, while increased acquittals due to the insanity defense were criticized for allowing criminals to avoid punishment.

The story has been interpreted as a satirical political commentary on American democracy, a parody of the work of Charles Dickens and Nathaniel Parker Willis, and is also understood as a critique on 19th-century medical practices.

Adaptations
One of the plays given at the Theatre du Grand Guignol in Paris was "Le Systéme du Dr Goudron et Pr Plume" (1903), adapted by André de Lorde. 
The French film Le système du docteur Goudron et du professeur Plume, also known as The System of Doctor Goudron and The Lunatics (1913), directed by Maurice Tourneur.
The German film Unheimliche Geschichten (1932) is based on two stories by Poe: "The Black Cat" and "The System of Doctor Tarr and Professor Fether".
An opera called Il sistema della dolcezza (1948), composed by Vieri Tosatti.
The Spanish film Manicomio (1954) is based on stories by several authors, including Poe's "The System of Doctor Tarr and Professor Fether".
An episode of The Alfred Hitchcock Hour entitled "A Home Away from Home" (27 September 1963), starring Ray Milland.
The Polish TV movie System (1972).
The surreal Mexican film La mansión de la locura (1973), in English The Mansion of Madness (aka Dr. Tarr's Torture Dungeon/House of Madness) by Juan López Moctezuma. 
Director S. F. Brownrigg's movie The Forgotten (1973), also known as Death Ward #13 and Don't Look in the Basement.
"(The System of) Dr. Tarr and Professor Fether" is the fifth track on Tales of Mystery and Imagination, an album by The Alan Parsons Project of music inspired by the works of Edgar Allan Poe.
Czech filmmaker Jan Švankmajer based part of his film Lunacy on this story. The film was also inspired by Poe's 1844 short story "The Premature Burial", as well as the works of the Marquis de Sade.
A one-act opera called A Method for Madness (1999), composed by David S. Bernstein to a libretto by Charles Kondek.
The animated Spanish film Gritos en el Pasillo (2007), in english Going Nuts, directed by Juanjo Ramírez, is a stop motion movie with peanuts, inspired in part by the story.
The story has been adapted for short films, including The System of Dr. Tarr and Professor Fether (2008) (changing the location to Philadelphia) and Tohtori Tarrin ja professori Featherin menetelmä (2012).
A 2014 film adaptation is titled Stonehearst Asylum.

See also
 O alienista, a satiric novella by Machado de Assis about an asylum

References

External links
 
 Full text on PoeStories.com with hyperlinked vocabulary words.
 

Short stories by Edgar Allan Poe
Works adapted into operas
1845 short stories
Works originally published in Graham's Magazine
Works set in psychiatric hospitals
Mental health in France
Short stories adapted into films
Short stories set in France